Galina Ivanovna Varlamova or Keptuke (native name) (18 January 1951 – 19 June 2019) was an Evenk writer, philologist and folklorist. She was an expert in Evenk language and folklore. She wrote in Russian, Evenk and Yakut languages.

Bibliography
Эпические традиции в эвенкийском фольклоре. Якутск, Изд-во "Северовед", 1996.  The book was heavily criticized.
Имеющая свое имя Джелтула-река. Повесть. - Якутск, 1989;
Рассказы Чэриктэ. На эвенкийском и русском языках. - Красноярск, 1990;
Маленькая Америка. Повесть, рассказы. - М., 1991;
Двуногий да поперечноглазый, черноголовый человек - эвенк и его земля Дулин Буга. - Якутск, 1991
"Фразеологизмы в эвенкийском языке", Новосибирск: Наука. Сиб. отд-ние, 1986. – 80 с. ( Ph.D. thesis)
"Эвенкийские сказания и сказки"

References

Russian writers
Russian philologists
Women philologists
Women linguists
Russian folklorists
Women folklorists
Evenks
1951 births
2019 deaths
Sakha-language writers
Russian people of indigenous Siberian descent
Russian women writers